Platysquilla eusebia is a species of mantis shrimp in the family Nannosquillidae, from the Mediterranean Sea and north-eastern Atlantic Ocean.

Distribution
P. eusebia is found in the Mediterranean Sea and adjacent parts of the Atlantic Ocean. It is one of only two species of mantis shrimp found in waters around the British Isles (the other being Rissoides desmaresti). Its occurrence in Galway Bay off the west coast of Ireland may represent the northern limit of its distribution.

Description
It is a mantis shrimp of the spearer type, possessing raptorial claws with nine or more teeth. It may be distinguished from the other species in its genus, P. enodis and P. horologii, by the number of epipods, and from Rissoides desmaresti by the number of spines on the last segment of the raptorial claw, with R. desmaresti having only five.

Taxonomy
Although previously placed in the family Squillidae, Platysquilla is now considered a member of the Nannosquillidae. P. eusebia was originally described in the geuns Squilla, but was moved by Raymond B. Manning to be the type species of the new genus Platysquilla in 1967.

References

Stomatopoda
Crustaceans of the Atlantic Ocean
Crustaceans described in 1816